Didymocentrotus is a monotypic genus in the family Cerambycidae described by Keith Collingwood McKeown in 1945. Its single species, Didymocentrotus foveatus, was described by Per Olof Christopher Aurivillius in 1917.

References

Acanthocinini
Beetles described in 1917
Monotypic Cerambycidae genera